Bruegger's Enterprises, Inc. is a restaurant operator and subsidiary of the Luxembourg-based company JAB Holding Company. It and its wholly owned subsidiary Threecaf Brands Canada, Inc., are franchisers and operators of Bruegger's bakery-cafés, and Michel's Baguette.

Bruegger's Bagels produce approximately 70 million bagels each year, and they hold the Guinness World Record for producing the world's largest bagel. The company is known for being the largest bakery of authentic New York style, kettle-boiled bagels in the U.S. with each location baking their 14 flavors of bagels on-site, each morning in small batches. Bruegger's also specializes in made-in-Vermont cream cheese, served in over 11 flavors. Aside from bagels, Bruegger's has a regular menu for dine-in, takeout, or delivery including: egg sandwiches, lunch deli sandwiches, muffins, cookies, side choices, as well as coffee, espresso drinks, iced drinks, tea, and soda. Bruegger's operates approximately 190 restaurants in 16 U.S. states and the District of Columbia.

Corporate history

Bruegger's was founded in 1983 by Nordahl Brue and Mike Dressell, with the first store opening in Troy, New York.

The business was bought by Quality Dining (a franchisee) in June 1996 for $142 million in stock, with the founders joining the Quality Dining board. The merge was not a comfortable one; within a short period Brue and Dressell became concerned with the ongoing operations and scope for growth, leading to a critical U.S. Securities and Exchange Commission (SEC) filing alleging a lack of strategic direction. Holding a combined 26% stake, Brue and Dressell called for reorganization of Quality Dining, resulting in Bruegger's being resold to Brue and Dressel in October 1997 for $45 million. Brue has since referred to the original sale as part of his "biggest mistake".

In May 2003, James J. Greco and Sun Capital Partners acquired the company from the founders.

Today, approximately 190 Bruegger's locations  operate in 16 U.S. states and the District of Columbia. The company is headquartered in Burlington,  Vermont. Bruegger's announced $200 million in revenue in 2008.

On November 13, 2009, Bruegger's purchased the retail operations of Timothy's World Coffee, mmmuffins, and Michel's Baguette through a wholly owned subsidiary called ThreeCaf Brands Canada, Inc. Bruegger's intends to continue operations of all three brands. The three brands combined operated approximately 140 locations.

On March 17, 2011, Groupe Le Duff of France announced the buyout of Bruegger's. Le Duff already has a U.S. presence with its La Madeleine brand, which has 60 units domestically. Le Duff plans to "Francify" some Bruegger's locations and will combine other units with Brioche Dorée outlets. The first European Bruegger's opened in Rennes in 2013 (Paris and Toulouse in 2015).

In December 2011, James J. Greco announced he would be stepping down as CEO at the end of the year to pursue other opportunities.

On August 24, 2017, it was announced that Bruegger's owner Le Duff America announced that Caribou and its privately held owner JAB Holdings had agreed to buy the bagel chain. The terms of the deal, which closed at the end of September, were not disclosed. In December 2017 Bruegger's closed 30 locations, primarily in Eastern markets. 

In April 2018, Threecaf Brands sold Timothy's World Coffee and mmmuffins to Canadian company MTY Food Group for $1.7 million, of which $1.2 million was in cash, $0.2 million in assumed liabilities, and $0.3 million as a holdback.

Subsidiaries

Michel's Bakery Café

Michel's Bakery Café, formerly named Michel's Baguettes, is a Canadian bakery-café founded in 1980, operating restaurants throughout Canada. The company is one of the largest bakery-café chains in Canada and operates both corporate and franchise locations. The company was purchased by Timothy's Coffees of the World Inc. in 2001. Timothy's continued to operate the Michel's Bakery Café stores under their original trade name, Michel's Baguette. On November 13, 2009, Michel's Baguette was sold to Bruegger's Enterprises, Inc. along with Timothy's Coffee and mmmuffins through a wholly owned subsidiary called ThreeCaf Brands Canada Inc. Bruegger's has continued to operate these chains. The company has since revitalized its operations, revamped its aesthetics and changed its name to Michel's Bakery Café.

World record
On August 27, 2004, Bruegger's created the world's largest bagel, which currently holds the Guinness World Record. It was cooked at the New York State Fair and was sliced and served to onlookers, who were encouraged to make donations to benefit local food banks.

See also
 Fast casual restaurant
 List of bakery cafés

References

External links
 

American subsidiaries of foreign companies
Bagel companies
Bakeries of the United States
Bakery cafés
Fast casual restaurants
American companies established in 1983
Restaurants established in 1983
Food and drink companies based in Vermont
Restaurant franchises
1983 establishments in New York (state)
1996 mergers and acquisitions
2003 mergers and acquisitions
2011 mergers and acquisitions
2017 mergers and acquisitions
Coffeehouses and cafés in the United States